The Pedagogical and Technological University of Colombia, also known as "La UPTC", is a national public university in Colombia with main campus in Tunja and presence in the country's seven departments.

The university has a headquarters, three sectional branches, six sites for extension programs and 21 regional centers for distance learning in which there are 11 faculties, 52 undergraduate academic programs, 15 undergraduate academic distance programs and 23 postgraduate programs. It is an educational, scientific and technological university, currently ranked number 7 among the best 64 universities in Colombia (2012) according to a study by Research Sapiens Group research sapiens that built a ranking, which was titled "U-Sapiens Ranking Colombia" where are cataloged 64 universities of the country.

Campus 
The most important branches of the Uptc are located in the main cities in Boyacá.

Principal 
Headquarters - Some landmarks in the campus are the Jorge Palacios Preciado Library, Central Building, Camilo Torres Restrepo square, the university city and the Escuela Normal Superior Santiago de Tunja.
Avenida Central del Norte, 150003 Tunja
 Health Faculty
Hospital Antiguo San Rafael Tunja

Branches 
 Sogamoso Faculty
Calle 4 Sur 15-134. 152211, Sogamoso
 Duitama Faculty
Carrera 18 23-55. 150461, Duitama
 Chiquinquirá Faculty
Calle 14A 2-36. 154640, Chiquinquirá
 Bogotá Faculty
Carrera 14 44-51. 110311, Bogotá D.C.

Extension Program Centers 
 DC
 Boyacá: Garagoa, Puerto Boyacá, Soatá, chiquinquirá
 Casanare: Yopal, Aguazul

Distance Education Regional Centers 
 Amazonas: Leticia
 Bogotá
 Boyacá: Chiquinquirá, Chiscas, Duitama, Garagoa, Muzo, Puerto Boyacá, Samacá, Soatá, Sogamoso
 Casanare: Monterrey, Yopal
 Cundinamarca: Cogua, Fusagasugá, Gachetá, La Palma, Quetame
 Meta: Acacías
 Santander: Barbosa, Barrancabermeja

See also 
 List of universities in Colombia
 List of Muisca research institutes

References

External links 
  Official website
  Uptc online

 
Universities and colleges in Colombia
Buildings and structures in Tunja
Buildings and structures in Sogamoso
Buildings and structures in Boyacá Department
Duitama